Lyne Charlebois is a Canadian film and television director, most noted as the director and cowriter of the 2008 film Borderline.

Charlebois began her career as a photographer, who had one of her first jobs in the film industry shooting promotional stills for Jean-Claude Lauzon's 1987 film Night Zoo. She then became a music video director for artists including Daniel Bélanger and Laurence Jalbert. She won a Prix Félix for Best Video in 1991 for Marjo's "Je sais, je sais", and was a three-time Juno Award nominee for Best Music Video for Spirit of the West's "Political" at the Juno Awards of 1992, Mae Moore's "Bohemia" at the Juno Awards of 1993 and for Gogh Van Go's "Tunnel of Trees" at the Juno Awards of 1995. She won the award in 1995.

She subsequently worked in television, directing episodes of Bliss, Tabou, Nos étés and Sophie, and made the short films Quel jour était-ce? in 2001 and Nous sommes tous les jours in 2006.

She collaborated with Marie-Sissi Labrèche on the screenplay for Borderline, and directed the film. At the 29th Genie Awards in 2009, Charlebois and Labrèche were cowinners of the Genie Award for Best Adapted Screenplay, and Charlebois was a shortlisted nominee for the Genie Award for Best Director; at the 2009 Prix Jutra, she won the award for Best Director.

References

External links

Living people
Canadian women film directors
Canadian television directors
Canadian music video directors
Canadian women screenwriters
Canadian women artists
Canadian photographers
Canadian women photographers
Film directors from Quebec
Best Screenplay Genie and Canadian Screen Award winners
Juno Award for Video of the Year winners
Writers from Quebec
Artists from Quebec
Canadian women television directors
Year of birth missing (living people)
Best Director Jutra and Iris Award winners